Dejan Pecakovski (born 12 January 1986) is a Macedonian handball player who plays for RK Tineks Prolet.

References

1986 births
Living people
Macedonian male handball players
Sportspeople from Bitola